Palatka is the name of several inhabited localities in Russia.

Urban localities
Palatka, Magadan Oblast, an urban-type settlement in Khasynsky District of Magadan Oblast; 

Rural localities
Palatka, Nizhny Novgorod Oblast, a village in Achkinsky Selsoviet of Sergachsky District in Nizhny Novgorod Oblast